Molly Musiime Asiimwe  is a Ugandan politician and woman member of parliament. In 2021, she was elected as a woman representative in parliament for Rwampara district during the 2021 Uganda general elections.

She is a member of the ruling National Resistance Movement political party.

In the eleventh parliament, she serves on the Committee on Education and Sports.

See also
List of members of the eleventh Parliament of Uganda
National Resistance Movement
Parliament of Uganda.
Member of Parliament.
Rwempara District.

References

External links 

 Website of the Parliament of Uganda.

National Resistance Movement politicians
Women members of the Parliament of Uganda
Members of the Parliament of Uganda
21st-century Ugandan women politicians
21st-century Ugandan politicians
Living people
Year of birth missing (living people)